Koshtan-Tau (Karachay-Balkar: Къоштан-тау, means paired mountain) is the highest peak (5,144m) of the Koshtan massif of the central Caucasus Mountains in the Kabardino-Balkaria Republic of Russia, near the border with Georgia. The peak was first ascended in 1889 by Herman Woolley and party.

Notes

Further reading 
 A. F. Mummery, H. W. Holder, W. F. Donkin and C. T. Dent, "Further Explorations in the Caucasus", Proceedings of the Royal Geographical Society and Monthly Record of Geography, New Monthly Series, Vol. 11, No. 6 (Jun., 1889), pp. 351–374

External links
  Columbia Encyclopedia entry

Mountains of Kabardino-Balkaria
Five-thousanders of the Caucasus